The University of Johannesburg (UJ) is a public university located in Johannesburg, South Africa. The University of Johannesburg came into existence on 1 January 2005 as the result of a merger between the Rand Afrikaans University (RAU), the Technikon Witwatersrand (TWR) and the Soweto and East Rand campuses of Vista University. Prior to the merger, the Daveyton and Soweto campuses of the former Vista University had been incorporated into RAU. As a result of the merger of Rand Afrikaans University (RAU), it is common for alumni to refer to the university as RAU. The vice-chancellor and principal of UJ is Professor Tshilidzi Marwala who took office on 1 January 2018. Between 2005 and 2017, UJ's vice-chancellor and principal was Prof Ihron Lester Rensburg.

The newly emerged institution is one of the largest comprehensive contact universities in South Africa from the 26 public universities that make up the higher education system. UJ has a student population of over 50 000, of which more than 3000 are international students from 80 countries.

History

Early developments

British Rule, 1900sDuring the Johannesburg gold rush a number of training institutions were founded to supply skilled labour to the gold mines demands. One of those institutions was Witwatersrand Technical Institute, founded in 1903, with its roots in the Kimberly School of Mines. It eventually became Technikon Witwatersrand in 1979. This institute was based on the British system and the medium of instruction was English. Not only did its policies restrict access to white students only, but it also restricted admission to those who were well versed in the English language. In 2006, the property belonging to the Technikon Witwatersrand was sold by the University of Johannesburg, which had already absorbed the operations of the Technikon Witwatersrand at that stage.

Independence, 1960sIt would take more than half a century before the independence of South Africa from the British, that the newly elected National Party sought to provide education in the Afrikaans language, the third most spoken mother tongue language in South Africa. This led to the foundation of Rand Afrikaans University (RAU) in 1966. At the time of its founding, RAU was the second university to be established in Johannesburg and it was established through an act of parliament as the academic hub for Afrikaners. After the fall of Apartheid in 1994, African students started to become more involved in previously white institutions of higher education. RAU was no exception as for the first time in 1995, it had the largest number of African students in its ranks, followed by the University of the Witwatersrand, Rhodes University and the University of Cape Town.

In 1982, Vista University admitted the first black students in designated urban black settlements across South Africa. It was established in Port Elizabeth. It had seven satellite campuses throughout South African townships, making tertiary education accessible to most African people, and it had its first academic year in 1983.

Recent history

It was envisioned that a modern university would spring from unification, and not separation, as it was enforced in the past. The University of Johannesburg, established on 1 January 2005, is the result of the incorporation of the East Rand and Soweto campuses of Vista University into the Rand Afrikaans University (RAU) (1 January 2004). The merger of the modified RAU and the Technikon Witwatersrand took place on 1 January 2005 thus creating the University of Johannesburg (UJ).

The integration of these institutions – with seemingly more differences that similarities, offers UJ a unique identity and character, which serves to bridge the chasms that previously divided South Africa. Indeed, no other university in South Africa truly represents the rainbow nation like University of Johannesburg.

The incorporation and merger was part of a series of major programmes which restructured higher education in South Africa; a result of the National Plan for Higher Education (2001). Consequently, this meant there was a reduction from 36 universities and technikons to 22 higher education institutions. South Africa now has 11 traditional universities, five universities of technology and six comprehensive institutions.

Logo and brand identityThe University of Johannesburg distinguishes itself from its previous institutions as a new, adaptable and progressive institution. Early on it was decided that UJ did not want a coat of arms and motto, as are custom with other tertiary educational institutions in South Africa. The administration decided rather to opt for a logo and brand identity. An internal competition was held where current students could put forward their proposals. In the interim, the previous motto of the Rand Afrikaans University "Diens Deur Kennis" (Afrikaans for Service Through Knowledge) was maintained.

The design by Joey Hifi was chosen as the official logo of the university. Present in the design are two hoopoos upupa africana. The hoopoo is the official mascot of the UJ Sports Bureau.

Leadership

Chancellor 
  Wendy Luhabe
  Professor Njabulo Ndebele
  Dr Phumzile Mlambo-Ngcuka

Vice-Chancellor and Principal
  Professor Ihron Rensburg
  Professor Tshilidzi Marwala
  Professor Lethokwa Mpedi

Chair of Council
 Professor Roy Marcus
 Mr Mike Teke
 Ms Xoliswa Kakana

Campuses
UJ has four campuses: the Auckland Park Kingsway, Auckland Park Bunting Road, Doornfontein and Soweto campuses – all located in the metropolitan area of the City of Johannesburg.

The university comprises a built-up area in excess of 45,000m2 and the facilities available at the respective campuses include:
 Lecture rooms and micro-laboratories
 Libraries
 Sports facilities
 Auditoriums, halls, galleries and conference venues
 Student shopping centres, restaurants and cafeterias
 Campus and health clinics.
 A villa for postgraduate students
 Court rooms

UJ owns an island in the Vaal River, formerly known as RAU Island.

Auckland Park, Kingsway
 Auckland Park (APK), or the Kingsway Campus Auckland Park (former RAU campus) 
APK, is the largest and most populated campus of the University of Johannesburg. It is also the seat of the administration and governance body of the university. The campus was formerly the only educational campus of the Rand Afrikaans University. The campus gets its name from a major Johannesburg road, Kingsway Avenue, that runs along the north-east side of the campus. The roads that form the boundary of the campus are (clock-wise) University Road, Ditton Avenue, Ripley Road, Hampton Avenue, Studente Avenue, Akademie Road and Perth Road. Although the official name of the campus implies that it is in Auckland Park, it actually falls just out of that suburb by one street. It is technically in the suburb of Rossmore with the first-year parking lot bordering the suburb of Melville, Gauteng.

Auckland Park, Bunting Road
 Auckland Park, Bunting Road (APB), or the Bunting Road Campus Auckland Park (former TWR campus)
The ABP was originally a campus of the Technikon Witwatersrand. Uniquely, the campus is an enclosed section of a suburb. The main thoroughfare of the suburb is Bunting Road. The name Bunting Road, according to the City of Johannesburg archives is derived from a subspecies of bird and not the decorative banner it is currently associated with. It houses the Faculty of Art, Design and Architecture.

Doornfontein
 Doornfontein (DFC), or the Doornfontein Campus (former TWR campus). It houses the administrative offices of the Faculty of Health Sciences, as well sub faculties of Engineering and Built Environment as well as Science. The campus offers several health services to the public via its private, yet affordable clinics. These clinics are most served by students obtaining clinic hours required prior to that of the completion of qualification. The faculty has several practical and academic workspaces available for students including a large practical workshop for the Faculty of Engineering and the Built Environment; Rescue Simulation Center; Laser Research Facilities and Anatomical Dissection Hall for the Faculty of Health Sciences; and several laboratories serving for faculties of Health Science, Engineering and Built Environment, and Science.

Soweto
 Soweto (SWC), or the Soweto Campus (former RAU campus, previously former Vista University Soweto campus)

The East Rand Campus (ERC) was temporarily closed halfway through 2007 pending proposed redevelopment of the campus, provisionally planned for reopening in 2009.

Organisation and administration

The Senate is the body responsible for academic matters at the university and is mainly made up of full professors and heads of departments. By law, the Senate is accountable to the university's Council for all the teaching, learning, research and academic functions of the institution and all other functions delegated or assigned to it by the Council.

The UJ Senate currently comprises about 250 members under the chairperson-ship of Vice-Chancellor Prof Tshilidzi Marwala. The Registrar is the Secretarial of the UJ Senate.
The UJ's main shareholder is the Department Of Higher Education and Training - which at the present moment is led by Minister Blade Ndzimande

Academic profile

Admission and registration
As it is a common practice with all South African universities, South African applicants to the University of Johannesburg are required to apply in advance for admission into their preferred course by no later than the end of September. Therefore, prospective South African matriculants must apply for their preferred course of study before the completion of their matric year. As of 2013, the University of Johannesburg has adopted a "no walk-in" policy and therefore, prospective and current students are required to apply for admission and complete their registration online.

International students have to comply with a specialised admission process and must apply for admission into their preferred course by no later than the end of September.

Registration for undergraduates and postgraduates takes place before the commencement of the academic year. New registrations for qualifying matriculants takes place in January shortly after the matric results are released.

Teaching and degrees
Undergraduate teaching takes place over the duration of four terms or two semesters during the course of the year. Some subjects are taught throughout the duration of the year known as year-long subjects and other subjects are taught over the course of two terms or one semester. Some subjects have prerequisites such as a requirement for a student to complete a specific course or subject/s before they are permitted to continue with a related subject.

The teaching terms usually coincide with Gauteng public school terms though can change as the university administration sees fit.

Undergraduate programmeOnce a high school student has passed their Matric examinations obtaining an NQF level 5 qualification and meeting the minimum requirements of their chosen undergraduate programme the student may pursue a bachelor's degree, Advanced Diploma, Post Graduate Certificate or B-tech which are set to be completed within three years for most faculties however, there are sometimes options to extend ones undergraduate programme usually by an extra year. Once a graduate has passed all of the requisite modules for their degree, the graduate will obtain a degree certificate (NQF level 7) with all the rights and privileges conferred on them by the university in accordance with the National Qualifications Framework (NQF).

The University of Johannesburg also offers undergraduate Higher Certificates and Advanced National (vocational) Certificates (NQF level 5) as well as National Diplomas and Advanced certificates (NQF level 6) which usually require fewer than three years to complete.

Graduate programmeOnce an undergraduate has obtained their undergraduate bachelor's degree, Advanced Diploma, Post Graduate Certificate or B-tech, the undergraduate may wish to pursue further education and research by obtaining a post-graduate degree. The South African Qualifications Authority (SAQA) is a statutory body, regulated in terms of the National Qualifications Framework Act that governs the National Qualification Framework (NQF) where an undergraduate may progress to further levels of education. The highest level the university may confer on a student is an NQF level of 10, also known as a PhD. The progression from one NQF level to the next after obtaining a bachelor's degree, advanced diploma, post-graduate certificate or B-tech is the following:
 NQF level 8 - honours degree, post-graduate diploma and professional qualifications
 NQF level 9 - master's degree
 NQF level 10 - doctor's (PhD) degree

Scholarships and financial support
There are many opportunities for students studying at the University of Johannesburg to receive financial support. One of the primary methods in which a student may receive financial support is as a result of a students academic performance at the end of their matriculation year. This type of financial support is known as an academic merit bursary that is only awarded to students who observe the stringent "M-score" academic requirements of such support. The academic merit bursary offers up to 100% payment of tuition fees and an additional stipend amount to qualifying applicants.

An alumni bursary is offered to qualifying postgraduate students that may be applied for in the applicants respective faculty offices. Postgraduate students may apply for funding through the National Research Foundation (NRF) that offers up to 100% payment of tuition fees and an additional stipend amount to qualifying applicants.

Alternative funding includes applying for funding through the National Student Financial Aid Scheme (NSFAS) as well as through applying for funding through external sponsorship bursaries.

Rankings and reputation

 UJ is the first and only African university admitted to the highly respected consortium of 28 research-intensive universities in the world, Universitas 21 – a significant endorsement of the growing international stature of UJ. Under South Africa's National Development Plan (NDP), the Vision 2030 Awards honoured UJ in 2017 for the role the university plays in providing sound education to a diverse South African and international population. 
 UJ is now ranked 2nd amongst Africa's universities, 2nd in South Africa, and ranked within the top 2.3% of universities in the world as published in the QS World University Rankings 2022/2023.
 UJ is ranked 63rd among all BRICS universities.
 International recognition for the University of Johannesburg has been included within the top 200 universities listed in the THE Young University Rankings 2017 results.

Collaborations

Libraries, collections and museums

 The Kingsway Library serves the Kingsway campus (APK) and contains an extensive selection of research literature spread over seven levels. It is located at the main entrance to the Kingsway campus in the vicinity of the administrative department of the campus.
 Bunting Road Campus Library
 Doornfontein Campus Library
 Soweto Campus Library

Research

The University of Johannesburg has a large research compendium, with researchers in various fields and research focus areas. The university has 176 rated researchers, six of whom are NRF "A-rated" researchers, internationally recognised in their fields.

Research centres

Below is a list of all the research centres at the University of Johannesburg with information regarding their efforts, breakthroughs and other information where applicable.

 Centre for Visual Identities in Art and Design: The Centre for Visual Identities in Art and Design (CVIAD) is a crucial part of the University of Johannesburg's Faculty of Art, Design and Architecture. Established in 2007, CVIAD's main objectives include developing the faculty as a renowned hub for practice-based research via involvement with issues of image pertaining to text within art and design practices, and developing a body of knowledge in the fields of visual identities in art and design through the research of its Research Associates, Post-doctoral Fellows, and Staff Researchers as well as through Post-Graduate research efforts. The centre presents research in many formats, such as: exhibitions, installations, video screenings, live performances, curatorial practices, textual outputs by academics (including journals and periodicals), research projects undertaken by individuals and groups, workshops, seminars, conferences, discussions and presentations.
 Centre for Education Rights and Transformation:  The Centre for Education Rights and Transformation (CERT) forms part of the Faculty of Education and was founded on 15 October 2009 at the Bunting Road Campus. One of the keynote speakers at the founding of CERT was Dr. Neville Alexander, a former prisoner who served time with Nelson Mandela at Robben Island. All the staff members that form part of the CERT have an avid interest in linking academic scholarship with societal changes and public involvement.
 Centre for Education Practice Research: The Centre for Education Practice Research (CEPR) forms a part of the Faculty of Education and was officially established on 24 April 2007 at the University of Johannesburg's Soweto Campus. CEPR's main objective is to foster research efforts which are dedicated to the generation of knowledge with regards to the practices and development of education in Southern African region.
 Advanced Composite Materials
 Industrial Electronics Technology Research Group
 Mineral Processing & Technology
 Photonics Research Group
 Stream Processing Research Group
 Telecommunications Research Group: The Telecommunications Research Group forms part of the Faculty of Engineering and the Build Environment.
 Laser Research Centre 
 Research Centre on Civil Engineering Materials: The Research Centre on Civil Engineering Materials is presently being founded in the ABA Brink Materials Laboratory and will form part of the operations of the Faculty of Engineering and the Build Environment.
 Water & Health Research Centre: The Water and Health Research Centre consists of a Water Research Group based in the Department of Civil Engineering Science, which forms part of the Faculty of Engineering and the Build Environment, and various other water-related groups in the university, like the Water and Health Research Unit. The Water and Health Group involves various researchers working on water research from several faculties at the University of Johannesburg and from other universities as well.
 Centre for Culture and Languages in Africa
 Centre of Social Development in Africa
 Centre for Sociological Research
 South African Institute for Advanced Constitutional, Public & Human Rights
 The Institute of Transport and Logistics Studies in Africa
 Centre for Aquatic Research
 African Centre for DNA Barcoding: The African Centre for DNA Barcoding (ACDB) is a subsidiary of the University of Johannesburg and an academic unit contained within the departments of Botany & Plant Biotechnology and Zoology, and jurisdiction of the Faculty of Science. The mission of ACDB is to facilitate the gap of knowledge and to enhance the research frameworks for global, regional and inter-institutional co-operation in Africa in relation to key fields of DNA technology, such as biodiversity and DNA barcoding. As of July 2013, ACDB has catalogued barcodes for 15 584 plant specimens across 8 352 species and 14 253 animal specimens across 1 493 species, resulting in 29 837 specimens across 9 845 species overall. The International Barcode of Life project received a financial grant of $2.2 million from Canada's International Development Research Centre so that researchers from Argentina, Costa Rica, Kenya, Peru and South Africa could play key roles in the project, of which ACDB forms an important part. The Japanese car manufacturer Toyota also sponsors ACDB in the form of a fleet of vehicles which researchers utilize to access rough terrains. They work together with the research team in a project called the Toyota Enviro Outreach.
 Centre for Nanomaterials Sciences Research: The Centre for Nanomaterials Sciences Research (CNSR) was established in 2007 and was founded on four key aspects: nanomaterials for water treatment, nanomaterials for catalysis applications, bio-nanomaterials, and nanomaterials for sensors and photovoltaic applications. The CNSR supports and facilitates the individual and cooperative research efforts and is a part of the Department of Applied Chemistry, which is a department which falls under the Faculty of Science. The centre has worked with the South African Chemical Institute, the Water Institute of Southern Africa, the South African Nanotechnology Initiative, the American Chemical Society and the Royal Society of Chemistry in the past.
 Paleoproterozoic Mineralisation Research Group: The Paleoproterozoic Mineralisation Research Group (PPM) falls under the jurisdiction of the Department of Geology, which falls under the Faculty of Science. The PPM's main objectives include studying and modelling the relationship between environmental change and styles of mineralization in the Precambrian Era, particularly on the Paleoproterozoic Era, studying the temporal and spatial distribution, composition, and origin of mineral deposits on local and regional scales, and training postgraduate students in the field of Economic Geology. The PPM is financed by grants provided by the National Research Foundation of South Africa and the Faculty of Science.
 Sustainable Energy Technology and Research Centre
 Centre for Catalysis Research
 Centre for Banking Law
 Centre for International Law
 Centre for Africa-China Studies

Research focus areas

Below is a list of the spread of the NRF rated researchers per faculty as at April 2013.
 Science 42%
 Humanities 21%
 Engineering and the Built Environment 7%
 Health Sciences 7%
 Law 7%
 Education 5%
 Art, Design and Architecture 4%
 Management 4%
 Economic and financial sciences 3%

Faculties
The University of Johannesburg is composed of eight faculties.

Art, Design and Architecture
The Faculty of Art, Design and Architecture (FADA) offers programmes in eight creative disciplines.

FADA is home to the following departments:
 Department of Industrial Design 
 Department of Architecture
 Department of Fashion Design
 Department of Graphic Design
 Department of Interior Design
 Department of Jewellery Design and Manufacture
 Department of Multimedia
 Department of Visual Art

College of Business and Economics 
The University of Johannesburg's College of Business and Economics (CBE) was launched on 1 July 2017. The college emerged from the former Faculty of Management and the former Faculty of Economic and Financial Sciences. It has succeeded in helping a lot of students academically and is preferred by many SA students

Education
The faculty of Education's research focus areas include ecologists of learning to ecologists of practice, learning to be a teacher – towards learner outcomes in schools, discourse and performative practice of teachers in language literacy and communication, keystone species in the science and mathematics classrooms of two schools, teachers building practice as community counselors, teachers and tools: crafting technology education in practice, teacher identity and the culture of schools, Information and communication technology in schools, Values and human rights in education, and aggression in secondary schools in South Africa.

Engineering and the Built Environment
The faculty of Engineering and the Built Environment's research focus areas include civil engineering materials research, chromium steels, control and image processing, industrial electronics technology, manufacturing, mineral processing and technology, optical communications, process optimization of thermodynamic systems, small-scale mining and minerals, speech and signal processing, telecommunications, unmanned aerial vehicles, water research.
 Department of Aircraft Maintenance and Engineering
 Department of Chemical Engineering
 Department of Civil Engineering Science
 Department of Civil Engineering Technology
 Department of Construction Management and Quantity Surveying
 Department of Electrical and Electronic Engineering Science 
 Department of Electrical and Electronic Engineering Technology
 Department of Metallurgy
 Department of Mechanical & Industrial Engineering Technology
 Department of Mechanical Engineering Science
 Department of Mine Surveying
 Department of Mining Engineering
 Department of Quality and Operations Management
 Department of Town and Regional Planning.

Health Sciences
The faculty of Health Sciences' research focus areas include Laser Research, optometrics science, Water and Health Research. There is also a big department for sport studies which includes sport psychology, sport management, sport communication, sport development and sport science. It houses the following departments (some of which serve as the best in the country):
 Department of Biomedical Technology
 Department of Chiropractic
 Department of Emergency Medical Care
 Department of Environmental Health
 Department of Homeopathy
 Department of Human Anatomy and Physiology
 Department of Medical Imaging and Radiation (Radiography)
 Department of Nursing
 Department of Optometry
 Department of Podiatry
 Department of Somatology
 Department of Sport and Movement Studies

Humanities
The faculty of Humanities' research focus areas include social development in Africa, sociological research, culture and languages in Africa, African-European studies, and the study of democracy.

Law
The faculty of Law's research focus areas include the study of economic crime, private international law in Africa, banking law, international law in Africa, international and comparative labour and social security law, and sport law.

Science
The faculty of Science's research focus areas include nanotechnology, energy and sustainable development, aquatic eco-toxicology, and economic geo-metallurgy.

The faculty currently has 11 departments: Academy of Computer Science and Software Engineering; Biochemistry; Biotechnology and Food Technology; Botany and Plant Biotechnology; Chemical Sciences; Geography, Environmental Management & Energy Studies; Geology; Physics; Pure and Applied Mathematics; Statistics; and Zoology.

Traditions and student activities

The University of Johannesburg has a students' representative council (SRC) referred to as the UJSRC, as well as an SRC for each of the four campuses. The UJSRC consists of eight members, two members per campus, and they are elected by the student bodies of each campus. The UJSRC represents all UJ students, addressing issues and concerns which are of relevance to the whole student body. Each individual campus has its own Campus SRC which is elected from members of that particular campus' student body. The powers and functions of Campus SRCs are delegated to them by the UJSRC and Campus SRCs consist of ten members.

The most outstanding UJSRC president was Tshireletso Mati in 2019. Tshireletso became president of the UJSRC following a victory for the EFF Students Command at three of the university's four campuses.

Media and societies
The University of Johannesburg has a radio station that airs on its campuses called UJFM which aims to reflect the demographics of the university by airing content that is relevant to the target market. In April 2010, UJFM moved to the Bunting Road Campus where it has access to more professional, state of the art equipment. UJFM operates on a frequency of 95.4FM.

The university also has its own student newspaper, the UJ Observer. The purpose of the paper is to act as a communication medium for the student community with the goal of providing information to the student community, investigating issues of importance to the student community, and reflecting debates about current affairs on the various campuses of the university. The UJ Observer also offers journalism students a practical platform to learn and develop journalistic and managerial skill sets. However, students do not necessarily have to be journalism students to be a members of the UJ Observers editorial team. The paper operates on all of the campuses of the University of Johannesburg.

Students interested in taking part in charity events can do so via UJ's RAG (Remember and Give) committees, which are voluntary student organizations that raise funds and take part in community relief efforts. It is a tradition at UJ to host a RAG Week during the opening week of the academic year, in which events like musical performances, beauty competitions, fun days and float processions take place to generate funds. However, RAG committees operate throughout the academic year in various activities.

Registered students have the option to take part in societies at UJ which are divided into four broad kinds of society: academic societies, political societies, religious societies and social societies.

Athletics, sport, arts and culture

Athletics and sport

The university offers many different kinds of sport:

 Athletics
 Basketball
 Canoeing
 Climbing 
 Cricket
 Cycling
 Golf
 Gymnastics
 Hockey
 Judo
 Karate
 Netball
 Rowing
 Rugby
 Soccer
 Softball
 Squash
 Swimming
 Tennis 
 Triathlon
 Volleyball
 Water polo

As with the former RAU, rugby is a large focus of many students. UJ's competitive sport is regulated by the UJ Sports Bureau. Sport education is regulated by the Faculty of Health Science and Department of Sport and Movement Studies.

UJ has made a name for itself in athletics, hockey, basketball and rowing particularly. 2008 Olympic representative Juan Van Deventer was at the time a student. Several players who competed for the South Africa national basketball team at the 2011 African Basketball Championship in Madagascar were UJ Alumni.

UJ has numerous sporting venues:
 UJ Gymnasium – located on APK campus; used for various sports
 UJ Hockey Stadium and Grounds – located in Melville; used for hockey
 UJ Stadium – located in Westdene; used primarily for athletics but also soccer
 Grasdak – located in Westdene; used primarily for rowing
 Soweto Stadium – located in Soweto; used primarily for soccer
 Kingsway Campus Auckland Park – contains squash courts, a swimming pool and volleyball courts

Arts and culture

The University of Johannesburg has an arts centre, comprising a 436-seat theatre, an art gallery and rehearsal studios where the UJ Arts Academy rehearses. This academy consists of the University of Johannesburg Choir (conducted by Renette Bouwer and Sidumo Jacobs), the UJ Drama Company, the UJ Dance Company and the UJ Song and Dance Company.

People

Students
UJ enrolled 43,630 undergraduates and 6,280 graduate students in 2011. Women constituted 55 percent of the total student headcount.

Residence life

The Student Accommodation & Residence Life division is mainly responsible for the accommodation of approximately 19,000 students in both university owned and managed residences as well as off-campus accredited privately owned accommodation.

This is a vast division with 35 residences, including the seven day houses, spread over four campuses at the University of Johannesburg.

Off-campus accommodation's accredited properties are within 2 km of each campus and where they are beyond the prescribed radius; the set condition is that service providers are obliged to provide transport. Additionally, inter-campus transportation is provided for all students residing in off-campus residences and houses. The university offers to all students, a list of accredited off-campus accommodation.

Faculty and staff
 Ramani Durvasula, Ph.D. - Visiting Professor of Psychology

Notable alumni
The University of Johannesburg has numerous alumni and faculty members distinguished in their respective fields.

Popular culture

Notable events
 United States president Barack Obama visited the University of Johannesburg's Soweto campus on Saturday 29 June 2013. The main reasons for his visit included addressing questions relating to terrorism, the economy, trade in Africa and the US foreign policy. Obama addressed the young African leaders in Soweto, a historic part of South Africa which is now symbolic of tourism, culture, and a growing middle class. He received an honorary doctorate from the University of Johannesburg.

Controversy

In 2011 the university decided to suspend ties with Israeli Ben-Gurion University, citing the university's support for the Israeli military. The decision was seen to affect projects in biotechnology and water purification.

However, two days later, Ihron Rensburg, vice-chancellor and principal of the university issued a statement saying that "UJ is not part of an academic boycott of Israel...It has never been UJ's intention to sever all ties with BGU, although it may have been the intention of some UJ staff members."

References

General references
 Mthembu, A.2013. Soweto campus history. 17Sep2013. vol.1. Unpublished.

External links

 

 
University of Johannesburg
University of Johannesburg
Public universities in South Africa
Educational institutions established in 2005
2005 establishments in South Africa